Girls' Techno 293+ class competition at the 2018 Summer Youth Olympics took place from 7 to 12 October at the Club Náutico San Isidro.

Schedule

Results

References

External links
 Fleet Overall 

Sailing at the 2018 Summer Youth Olympics
Techno 293 competitions